Theobald, Count of Champagne may refer to:

 Theobald I of Champagne, Theobald III, Count of Blois, 1012–1089 
 Theobald II, Count of Champagne, also Theobald IV, Count of Blois, 1090–1152
 Theobald III, Count of Champagne, 1179–1201
 Theobald IV of Champagne, also Theobald I of Navarre, 1201/1234–1253
 Theobald V of Champagne, also Theobald II of Navarre, 1238/1253–1270